The Irish Jaunting Car is a folk song associated with the United Kingdom and Ireland. The words were reportedly written by the entertainer Valentine Vousden in the late 1850s, shortly after Queen Victoria's visit to Ireland, and events of the Crimean War. The original words to the song are widely debated and disputed.

Percy French wrote his own version of the song 'The Irish Jaunting Car' for his highly successful comic opera The Knight of the Road. Bernadette Lowry in her book (Dec 2021) 'Sounds of Manymirth on the Night's Ear Ringing: Percy French (1854-1920) His Jarvey Years and Joyce's Haunted Inkbottle' discovered that the reference 'he might be a Volunteer Vousdem' in James Joyce 's Finnegans Wake  is a reference to Percy French  and this opera by French which Joyce knew well. Lowry found reams of French's material including from his comic paper The Jarvey in Joyce's final novel. Crucially, she discovered the reference to the death of French in Liverpool on page 73-74 of Finnegans Wake. French's comic weekly magazine called The Jarvey from January 1889 -January 1891 is based on the ramblings of a jarvey on an  Irish Jaunting car. Lowry traced reams from the magazine in Finnegans Wake. Her scholarship marks the first serious exploration of The Jarvey comic journal. 

The original tune of The Irish Jaunting Car was later used by several other writers as a setting for their patriotic lyrics, particularly among the Irish diaspora in the United States. These included the 1861 marching song The Bonnie Blue Flag by Irish born entertainer Harry McCarthy, and The Homespun Dress by Carrie Belle Sinclair, a volunteer nurse from Savannah, Georgia. Further variants such as "The Irish Volunteer" continue to use the original tune.

Complete lyrics 
This variant of the lyrics appear in The Universal Irish Song Book: A Complete Collection of the Songs and Ballads of Ireland published in 1898 by Patrick John Kenedy. Numerous references to the current geopolitical situation at the time can be observed.

1

My name is Larry Doolan, I'm a native of the soil,

If you want a day's diversion, I'll drive you out in style,

My car is painted red and green, and on the door a star,

And the pride of Dublin City is my Irish jaunting car.

Chorus

Then if you want to hire me, step into Mickey Mar's,

And ask for Larry Doolan and his Irish jaunting car.

With me whip and pipe and pony, I'll take you near and far

To fairs, feasts, and festivals in me Irish jaunting car

2

When Queen Victoria came to Ireland her health to revive,

She asked the Lord Lieutenant to take her out to ride,

She replied unto his greatness, before they travelled far,

How delightful was the jogging of the Irish jaunting car.

Chorus

3

I'm hired by drunken men, teetotalers, and my friends,

But a carman has so much to do, his duty never ends,

Night and day, both wet and dry, I travelled near and far,

And at night I count the earnings of my Irish jaunting car.

Chorus

4

Some say the Russian bear is tough, and I believe it's true,

Though we beat him at the Alma and Balaklava too,

But if our Connaught Rangers would bring home the Russian Czar,

I would drive him off to blazes in my Irish jaunting car.

5

Some say all wars are over, and I hope to God they are,

For you know full well they ne'er were good for a jaunting car,

But peace and plenty - may they reign here, both near and far,

Then we drive to feasts and festivals in an Irish jaunting car. 

Chorus

6

They say they are in want of men, the French and English too,

And it's all about their commerce now they don't know what to do,

But if they come to Ireland our jolly sons to mar,

I'll drive them to the devil in my Irish jaunting car.

Chorus

Recordings 
 Sung by J. B. Smith, a Celebrated Irish Vocalist 
 17, Great Irish Marches, 1st Battalion Irish Guards 2002
 1, No Irish Need Apply, Gallant Sons of Erin 2003
 5, The Irish Jaunting Car, Ho! For The Kansas Plains, The Free Staters 2004
 2, Last Man Standing, Derek Warfield & the Young Wolfe Tones 2018

References 

1850s songs
Irish songs
Crimean War